Food Safety and Standards Authority of India (FSSAI) is a statutory body established under the Ministry of Health & Family Welfare, Government of India. The FSSAI has been established under the Food Safety and Standards Act, 2006, which is a consolidating statue related to food safety and regulation in India. FSSAI is responsible for protecting and promoting public health through the regulation and supervision of food safety.

The FSSAI is headed by a non-executive chairperson, appointed by the Central Government, either holding or has held the position of not below the rank of Secretary to the Government of India. Rajesh Bhusan is the current chairperson for FSSAI and Shri Ganji Kamala V Rao is the current chief executive officer for FSSAI.

The FSSAI has its headquarters at New Delhi. The authority also has 6 regional offices located in Delhi, Guwahati, Mumbai, Kolkata, Cochin, and Chennai. 14 referral laboratories notified by FSSAI, 72 State/UT laboratories located throughout India and 112 laboratories are NABL accredited private laboratories notified by FSSAI.

In 2021, with the aim of benefitting industries involved in manufacturing, handling, packaging and selling of food items, FSSAI decided to grant perpetual licenses to restaurants and food manufacturers on the condition that they file their returns every year.
Food Safety and Standards Authority of India License or Registration is required for any food business in India that manufactures, stores, transports, or distributes food. Depending on the size and nature of the company, FSSAI registration or license may be required.

History 
FSSAI was established on 5 September 2008 under Food Safety and Standards Act, 2006 which was operationalized in year 2006.  The FSSAI consists of a chairperson & 22 members. The FSSAI is responsible for setting standards for food so that there is one body to deal with and no confusion in the minds of consumers, traders, manufacturers, and investors. Ministry of Health & Family Welfare, Government of India is the Administrative Ministry of Food Safety and Standards Authority of India.  The following are the statutory powers that the FSS Act, 2006 gives to the Food Safety and Standards Authority of India (FSSAI).
 Framing of regulations to lay down food safety standards
 Laying down guidelines for accreditation of laboratories for food testing
 Providing scientific advice and technical support to the Central Government
 Contributing to the development of international technical standards in food
 Collecting and collating data regarding food consumption, contamination, emerging risks, etc.
 Disseminating information and promoting awareness about food safety and nutrition in India.

Location 
FSSAI is located in 4 regions 
 Northern Region – With head office at New Delhi.
 Eastern Region - With regional office at Kolkata
 Western region - With regional office at Mumbai
 Southern Region - With regional office at Chennai

Regulatory framework

The Food Safety and Standards Authority of India is a statutory body under Food Safety and Standards Act, 2006. The Food Safety and Standards Act (FSS), 2006 is the primary law for the regulation of food products. This act also sets up the formulation and enforcement of food safety standards in India. The FSSAI appoints food safety authorities on the state level.

The FSSAI functions under the administrative control of the Ministry of Health and Family Welfare. The main aim of FSSAI is to
 Lay down science-based standards for articles on food 
 To regulate the manufacture, storage, distribution, import, and sale of food
 To facilitate the safety of food

The FSS Act is a bucket for all the older laws, rules and regulations for food safety. The FSS Act took 7 older acts into one umbrella.
 Prevention of Food Adulteration Act, 1954 
 Fruit Products Order, 1955 
 Meat Food Products Order, 1973 
 Vegetable Oil Products (Control) Order, 1947
 Edible Oils Packaging (Regulation) Order 1998 
 Solvent Extracted Oil, De- Oiled Meal and Edible Flour (Control) Order, 1967 
 Milk and Milk Products Order, 1992.

Departments
 SCIENCE & STANDARDS DIVISION (I & II)
 REGULATIONS DIVISION
 QUALITY ASSURANCE DIVISION (I & II)
 REGULATORY COMPLIANCE DIVISION
 HUMAN RESOURCE & FINANCE DIVISION
 GENERAL ADMINISTRATION AND POLICY COORDINATION DIVISION
 INFORMATION TECHNOLOGY DIVISION
 SOCIAL AND BEHAVIOURAL CHANGE DIVISION
 TRADE AND INTERNATIONAL COOPERATION DIVISION
 TRAINING DIVISION
 RAJBHASHA

Research and quality assurance

Research
FSSAI has set certain guidelines for food safety research. The Research and Development division is responsible for research with the following objectives:
 Generate new knowledge that would help in continuously updating and upgrading food safety standards that are compatible with international organizations 
 Carry out evidence-based studies for improving or building Rules and regulations.

Quality Assurance
FSSAI has been mandated to perform various functions related to the quality and standards of food and drinks
. These functions in addition to others include "Laying down procedure and guidelines for notification of the accredited laboratories as per ISO17025." The FSSAI notified laboratories that are classified as:
 FSSAI Notified NABL Accredited Labs - 112 
 State Labs - 72
 Referral Labs - 14

Standards

Standards framed by FSSAI are prescribed under Food Safety and Standards (Food Product Standards and Food Additives) Regulation, 2011, Food Safety and Standards (Packaging and Labelling) Regulation, 2011 and Food Safety and Standards (Contaminants, Toxins, and Residues) Regulations, 2011.

The FSSAI has prescribed standards for the following:
 Dairy products and analogues 
 Fats, oils and fat emulsions 
 Fruits and vegetable products 
 Cereal and cereal products 
 Meat and meat products 
 Fish and fish products 
 Sweets & confectionery 
 Sweetening agents including honey 
 Salt, spices, condiments and related products 
 Beverages, (other than dairy and fruits & vegetables based)
 Other food product and ingredients 
 Proprietary food 
 Irradiation of food
 Fortification of staple foods i.e. vegetable oil, milk, salt, rice and wheat flour/maida

The development of standards is a dynamic process based on the latest developments in food science, food consumption pattern, new food products, and additives, changes in the processing technology leading to changed specifications, advancements in food analytical methods, and identification of new risks or other regulatory options.

Formulation of standards of any article of food under the Food Safety and Standards Act 2006, involves several stages. After consideration by the Food Authority, the draft standard is published (Draft notified), for inviting stakeholder comments. Since India is a signatory to the WTO-SPS Committee, Draft Standard is also notified in WTO. Thereafter, taking into account the comments received from the stakeholders, the Standard is finalized and notified in the Gazette of India, and implemented.

Consumer outreach

Consumers can connect to FSSAI through various channels. A GAMA portal for concerns regarding misleading claims and advertisements too is operated.

Applicable FSSAI License 
FSSAI issues three types of license based on the nature of the food business and turnover:
Registration: For Turnover less than ₹12 Lakh
State License: For Turnover between ₹12 Lakh to ₹20 Crore
Central License: For Turnover above ₹20 Crore

Other criteria like the location of the business, number of retail stores, etc. are needed while evaluating the nature of the license application.

Projects
In 2009 the FSSAI instigated a pilot project Safe Food, Tasty Food to improve the safety and quality of food being served at restaurants and other outlets, implementing agencies being local municipal authorities and industry associations (FICCI, CII, AIFPA and NRAI).

See also
National Institute of Nutrition, Hyderabad

References

External links

Food Safety and Standards Act, 2006

Food safety organizations
Government agencies of India
Consumer protection in India
Ministry of Health and Family Welfare
Food and drink in India
Food processing industry in India
Regulatory agencies of India

Fssai Registration Consultant